Chris Bennett may refer to:
 Chris Bennett (admiral) (born 1937), South African admiral and author
 Chris Bennett (hammer thrower) (born 1989), British hammer thrower
 Chris Bennett (hurler), Irish hurler
 Chris Bennett (musician) (born 1948), American singer, dancer and composer
 Chris Bennett (soccer) (born 1952), former Canadian international and NASL soccer player
 Chris Bennett (1953–2014), British-born American Egyptologist who founded The Egyptian Royal Genealogy Project
 Christopher L. Bennett, American science fiction author